Guangdong Institute of Arts and Sciences is a higher education institute located in Lianjiang, Guangdong Province, China. The school is accredited as a full-time institution of higher learning by the Guangdong Provincial People's Government and the Chinese Ministry of Education. It is affiliated with the Guangdong Provincial Department of Education.

Campus 

The Guangdong Institute of Arts and Sciences is located in the county-level city of Lianjiang, in Zhanjiang, Guangdong, China, near the Beibu Gulf. The school's campus was designed to house 20,000 people, covers an area of 1,590 mu, and the campus' buildings cover over 400,000 square meters. The campus has a number of lecture halls, libraries, administrative buildings, student dorms, cafeterias, and art galleries. The campus also has numerous tennis courts, badminton courts, volleyball courts, table tennis tables, and other athletic facilities. The school states that to add ecologic value to the campus, it has planted over 3,000 different types of plants.

Academics 

The school offers a total of 66 majors, spread across 7 departments and 4 colleges. There are 726 academic instructors, of which, 530 work for the school full-time. According to the school, in recent years, over 98% of graduates have gained employment.

Student life 
The school has 43 student organizations.

Departments 

Institute of International Education
Automotive Institute
School of Architecture and Engineering
Department of Art and Media
Information Engineering
Department of Finance
Management department
Department of Humanities
Mechanical and Electrical Engineering
Department of Bioengineering
Ideological and political department
Continuing Education

Partner universities 
: Thompson Rivers University
 : Nagasaki International University

References

External links 
  Guangdong Institute of Arts and Sciences Home page

Universities and colleges in Zhanjiang
Educational institutions established in 2006
2006 establishments in China